Terusan (also known as Trusan) is a settlement in Sabah, Malaysia. It is about three feet above sea level, and the approximate population within a seven-kilometer radius was 818 as of 2004.

Nearby towns and villages include Jambongan (17.6 nm north), Tagahan (6.3 nm south), Boaan (24.6 nm east), Si Kub (56.8 nm east), and Suba Talan (2.2 nm west).

References

External links
Information at the Traveling Luck World Index

Populated places in Sabah